Oplontis is an ancient Roman archaeological site located in the town of Torre Annunziata, south of Naples in the Campania region of southern Italy. The excavated site comprises two Roman villas, the best-known of which is Villa A, the so-called Villa Poppaea.

Like the nearby towns of Pompeii and Herculaneum, Oplontis was buried in ash during the volcanic eruption of Mount Vesuvius in 79 AD. However, the force of the eruption was even stronger than at these cities as not only roofs collapsed, but walls and columns were broken and pieces thrown sideways.

History and excavations

The town of Oplontis probably developed under where Torre Annunziata stands today. Excavations have revealed buildings particularly on the east and west sides of the town, the eastern one in the immediate vicinity of Villa A and the other almost at its boundary with Torre del Greco. It is thought that in antiquity, as elsewhere (e.g. at Herculaneum and Stabiae), luxury residential villas like Villa A lined the coast, whereas most productive (agricultural) villas were located farther inland.

Among the finds in the western zone, the most important is the Roman bath complex on the sea shore at Oncino (the Terme Nunziante) as a public building of Oplontis. R. Liberatore recorded the archaeology in detail and he identified it as belonging to Lucius Nonius Florus whose name is stamped on the edge of a terracotta basin in the baths, decorated with vegetal forms and galloping horses.

Unfortunately, the construction of the modern baths above them caused their destruction. Later two underground water supply or drainage tunnels belonging to the baths were found.

In addition remains of two residential villas were discovered nearby, one owned by Caius Siculius Caius Filius whose seal was found and from which a fine fresco was retrieved, though many other remains in the area were destroyed and stolen.

Excavations of Villa A

The first of the villas, known as Villa A, was discovered in 1593–1600 during the great construction project by Fontana of the Sarno aqueduct to feed the mills at Torre Annunziata, the same aqueduct that was tunnelled through Pompeii where he also found the first remains, but similarly no attempt was made to explore the ruins in Oplontis. This aqueduct still runs through the centre of Villa A. In 1785 the Spanish architect Francesco La Vega explored this area, known as Le Mascatelle, with tunnels  and found beautiful objects but soon gave up due to toxic gases.

In 1839–40 excavations in tunnels were restarted by Michele Rusca using La Vega's publications and he discovered for the first time the extent and quality of the building including two peristyles, mosaics and other decorations. He had to stop due to lack of funds.

From 1880 a series of mills and pasta factories were built in Via Fontanelle in the Oplontis area and ancient Roman walls, marble columns, mosaic pavements, and many fragments from a variety of objects were found in their foundation trenches. At the Iennaco pasta factory were found marble basins and lead pipes, two marble statuettes of “exquisite Greek production” one of the goddess Minerva. Many mosaics and frescoes were destroyed. A spring of mineral water erupted during drilling at a depth of 11m and its water was marketed.

In 1934, during construction of a private building in Via Fontanelle more finds came to light. Remains were found of some opus reticulatum and of a probable cryptoporticus. Vincenzo Cuccurullo ordered test trenches to be dug to which brought to light another perimeter wall in opus incertum with light traces of white plaster with traces of a vault.

From this time ever more frequent finds came to light as the town expanded and gradually it became clear that there was an important Roman site on the hill of Le Mascatelle. The "Friends of Oplontis" committee of volunteers was established in 1962 to promote proper excavation.

It was only in 1964 that a full-scale excavation was officially approved. However, even then it was somewhat chaotic and no official records were kept until 1971 when most of the rooms had already been exposed. Valuable information and many frescoes were lost during the period from excavation to final reconstruction. Even after 1971, records were not accurate and omitted details and discoveries that rendered proper reconstruction impossible.

In 1975 the only human skeleton was found at the northern edge of the site, an adult lying on its back 6 m above the floor of the villa who must have been carried by the volcanic flow probably from farther inland.

Today about 60% of the villa has been exposed.

History of Villa A

The oldest part of the building dates from c. 50 BC to which its Second-Style wall paintings belong.

Badly damaged in the AD 62 Pompeii earthquake, parts of the villa were rebuilt with Third-Style frescoes, also as famous as the earlier ones for their quality.

Villa A was probably uninhabited and still in the process of being rebuilt at the time of the AD 79 eruption, as a number of tools were found on the site and statues and columns were stored away from their proper places.

The power of the eruption made roofs and walls collapse, columns to break and be thrown sideways so that on excavation many pieces of walls were difficult to reassemble.

Villa B

In contrast to the sumptuously decorated Villa Poppaea, Villa B is much smaller and lacks the latter's lavish decoration. Villa B is a rustic, two-story structure with many rooms left unplastered and with tamped earth floors. The structure's plan reveals a central courtyard surrounded by a two-story peristyle of Nocera tufa columns. Nevertheless, more than seventy rooms were found on both ground and second-story levels. On the ground floor all four sides of the courtyard have barrel-vaulted rooms in opus incertum and opus reticulatum.

A bronze seal bearing the name of L. Crassius Tertius was found at the site.

It was built at the end of the 2nd c. BC. The complex was part of a wider settlement built before the construction of neighbouring Villa A.

This villa was not deserted at the time of the eruption: the remains of 54 people were recovered in one of the rooms of the villa, perishing in the surge that hit Oplontis. They were split into two groups, one group possessing   fine jewellery, silverware, and coins whilst the other group had none.

Recent archaeology has shown that it suffered unique type of destruction because of its proximity to the sea, different from Pompeii or Herculaneum. The volcanic eruption generated a pyroclastic flow that sped down the mountain toward Oplontis. The impact of the flow on the sea surface led to a type of "tsunami" which caused the violent entry and deposition of a water-heavy layer in the barrel-vaulted rooms (similar to the deposit that buried the skeletons on the shore of Herculaneum). The people sheltering at Oplontis died beneath a mixed mass of superheated gas, ash, and water. The impact of the wave probably also caused the collapse of the barrel-vaults.

Some of the rooms seem to have been used for manufacturing, and others were storerooms, while the upper floor contained the living quarters of the house. These circumstances, along with more than 400 amphorae recovered in the excavations, indicate the property was devoted to the production of wine, oil, and agricultural goods. The discovery of a series of weights seems to confirm this; a bronze seal found at the site preserved the name of Lucius Crassius Tertius, apparently its last owner.

The southern part of the upper floor is perhaps the owner's living quarters, as some rooms are decorated with paintings in the Fourth Style, and there is also a rare example of a second style painting from the Republican era.

A rare very ornate strongbox was found in the peristyle, perhaps fallen from the upper floor, containing over 200 coins, jewellery, and a seal ring. It was finely decorated with inlay in silver, copper, and gilded bronze typical of late Hellenistic design, and it had a complex locking system that was still used in the 19th century.

A sophisticated water drainage system was added late in the villa's history. At the north of the site the ground floor rooms were reconfigured and the street repaved.

See also
Archaeological sites in Naples

References

External links

Official website (English-language version)
The Oplontis Project
AD79 Year of Destruction Website

70s disestablishments in the Roman Empire
79 disestablishments
1974 archaeological discoveries
Archaeological sites in Campania
Buildings and structures in the Metropolitan City of Naples
Cities and towns in Campania
Coastal towns in Campania
Destroyed cities
Former populated places in Italy
National museums of Italy
Pompeii (ancient city)
Populated places established in the 1st millennium BC
Populated places disestablished in the 1st century
Pre-Roman cities in Italy
Roman sites of Campania
Torre Annunziata
Tourist attractions in Campania
World Heritage Sites in Italy
Poppaea Sabina
Roman towns and cities in Italy
Ruins in Italy